Haidershofen is a town located in Austria. The town is within the district of Amstetten, located in Lower Austria.

Geography
Haidershofen lies in the Mostviertel in Lower Austria on the border of Upper Austria near Steyr. About 14 percent of the municipality is forested.

References

Cities and towns in Amstetten District